The 2015 Sacramento Challenger was a professional tennis tournament played on hard courts. It was the 11th edition of the tournament which was part of the 2015 ATP Challenger Tour. It took place in Sacramento, California, United States between 3 October and 11 October 2015.

Singles main-draw entrants

Seeds

 1 Rankings are as of September 28, 2015.

Other entrants
The following players received wildcards into the singles main draw:
  Sekou Bangoura
  Taylor Fritz
  Alex Kuznetsov
  Matt Reid

The following player received entry as into the singles main draw with a protected ranking:
  Peter Polansky

The following players received entry into the singles main draw as a special exempt:
  Mackenzie McDonald

The following players entered as alternates:
  Marek Michalička
  Frances Tiafoe

The following players received entry from the qualifying draw:
  Marcos Giron
  Nicolas Meister
  Frederik Nielsen
  Tommy Paul

Champions

Singles

 Taylor Fritz def.  Jared Donaldson, 6–4, 3–6, 6–4

Doubles

 Blaž Kavčič /  Grega Žemlja def.  Dustin Brown /  Daniel Brands, 6–1, 3–6, [10–3]

External links
Official Website

 
Sacramento Challenger
Sacramento Challenger
Sacramento Challenger
Sacramento Challenger
Natomas Men's Professional Tennis Tournament